List of works by Alan Durst contains the works of sculptor Alan Durst, much of which was created for churches, chapels and cathedrals. Durst created many statues and other works that were intended for schools and private individuals.

His work was often carved in ivory, wood or stone. He drew inspiration from African art.

Works

Notable works

Church of the Holy Cross, Woodchurch
Durst executed the rood screen and an ivory processional Cross for the Church of the Holy Cross.  The rood screen was carved in 1933. The west side of the rood beam, facing the nave, features carvings of the Seven Sacraments represented as the fruit of the vine, which grows downwards from the foot of the cross above. From right to left the Sacraments are Baptism, Confirmation, Absolution, Holy Communion, Holy Orders, Holy Matrimony and Holy Unction. The figures on the supporting columns are - St. Augustine of Canterbury, Elijah, St. Peter, St. Luke, Moses, and St Columba. On the east side of the screen the Christ of the Apocalypse features at the top and on the beam beneath a priest is shown at the altar elevating the Host as the central act of the Church's worship. These two themes were proposed by the Reverend Bryan Robin who was the rector of the church at the time. Durst's carving include those on the uprights supporting the Rood Screen.  The church is located in Woodchurch Cheshire, an area of Birkenhead on the Wirral Peninsula, England.

Holy Trinity Church, Northwood

Durst was responsible for carvings on the clergy and choir stalls for Holy Trinity Church in Northwood Middlesex. These were carved in 1957 from English oak and dedicated by The Bishop of London. The carvings express prayer, praise and harmony. The Vicar's stall on the right shows two angels kneeling in prayer at the step of an altar. Between them is a symbol of the Holy Trinity with the Cross set above the world, which is superimposed on three intersecting circles. The other clergy stall on the left symbolising praise shows two angels, each holding in one hand a crown and in the other a ribbon proclaiming: "Holy, Holy, Holy". The bench ends of the choir stalls express harmony. Firstly, those on the west end of the stalls represent from the left: trumpet, cymbal and pipe; and from the right, organ, lute and harp. On the east end of the benches on the left are lyre, lute and tabret; and on the right sackbut, cornet and psaltery. The photograph to the left shows one of Durst's carvings, this of a psalter.

Llandaff Cathedral
Durst made a carved font for Llandaff Cathedral in Llandaff Wales from Derbyshire stone. It includes scenes from the Bible including Eve giving her account of the temptation before God, Isaiah, St John and the Virgin and Child and the Life of St Teilo.  On the upper part of the font the inscription reads: "QUI CREDERIT ET BAPTIZERATUS EVERIT SALVUS ERIT" (He that believeth and is baptized shall be saved). Part of the carving features the "Tree of Knowledge" with an angel before it holding a flaming sword. Eve kneels beneath the tree holding a tangled scroll. The Serpent is coiled around the tree and strikes at her heel. "SERPENS DECEPIT ME" (the serpent beguileth me). Isaiah prophesies the coming of Christ "ECCE VIRGO CONCIP" (Behold a Virgin shall conceive). The Tree of Life is shown against which stands the Angel of the Annunciation. Mary kneels before the cradle-altar upon which lies the infant Christ. Durst carved Saint John's vision. "ET FOLIO LIGNI AD SALVATEM CENTIUM" (The leaves of the Tree shall be for the healing of the Nations).  On the pedestal is the Welsh inscription "A DUW NID DA IMDURAW" (It is not good to strive against God) followed by references to St Teilo's life.

Manchester Cathedral
Durst executed several works for Manchester Cathedral The first can be seen in an oak panel above the south porch of the Good Shepherd and another work on the exterior tower. He carved angels of the roof of the Cathedral holding between them a coat of arms of Queen Elizabeth and The Queen Mother.

Royal Academy of Dramatic Art
Durst sculpted the masks of Comedy and of Tragedy above the entrance to the Royal Academy of Dramatic Art, Bloomsbury,  London

St Alphege Church, Solihull
For St Alphege Church in Solihull Warwickshire, Durst carved figures on the church corbels in the chancel. They were installed in 1950/1951. See record DRB64/203 held at the Warwickshire County Record Office.  One of the figures is shown below; an angel with chalice.

St Christopher's Church
Durst carved a font in Alcaster stone for St Christopher's Church in Withington near Manchester.

Winchester Cathedral

Durst carried out some carving on the memorial in Winchester Cathedral in Hampshire to Canon Bertram Kier Cunningham, this memorial completed in 1944. The carving was shown at the Royal Academy in 1942 before going to Winchester. It can be found in the east aisle in front of the tablet to Mary Pescod. The carving is a representation of "The Annunciation" and features the Angel Gabriel appearing before the Virgin Mary and greeting her with the words "Greetings, favoured one, the Lord is with you" - "Ave,gratia plena, Dominus tecum" or more simply "Ave Maria". Gabriel tells Mary that she would bear a son to be called Jesus. As is often the case Mary is shown reading a book on which would be written "Ecce virgo concipiet et pariet filium" ("Behold, the Virgin will conceive and will give birth to a son" - Isaiah 7:14). At the back of the work Durst carved several reliefs including a representation of the turning water into wine. As the whole piece is close to a wall Durst's reliefs are not seen to their best advantage and are difficult to photograph. Just behind Mary, Durst has carved a dove in which form the Holy Spirit was said to have descended on Mary. Mary replied to Gabriel with the words "Behold the handmaiden of the Lord, let it be to me according to your will" Luke 1:26-38. It is believed that the conception of Jesus took place at this moment and the "Festival of the Annunciation" is held on 25 March, exactly nine months before the birth of Jesus is celebrated. Durst was commissioned to carve birds on the terminals of the Winchester Cathedral Drip mouldings round the windows. The birds included woodpeckers, a thrush, robin, blackbird, wren, jackdaw, owl, seagull and a nesting swallow.

Other works

Churches

Schools

Public statues

Tombstones and graveyard sculptures

Other sculpture

Gallery of images

See also
Holy Cross Church, Woodchurch

Notes

References

Further reading
 Durst, Alan. (1938). "Wood Carving". How to series. The Studio in London & New York. Includes Durst's work at Woodchurch, Rossall School and the "Faun".

External links
Biography on the Tate Gallery website
Photograph of Alan Durst working on one of his pieces for Peterborough Cathedral
Listing covering the descendants of William Gibson 1804-1862 including Alan Durst.

Modern sculptors
English sculptors
English male sculptors
British architectural sculptors